University of Manitoba Grads were a senior men's amateur ice hockey team. They represented Canada at the 1931 World Ice Hockey Championships where they won the gold medal by defeating the United States team (represented by the Boston Hockey Club) by a final score of 2 - 0.

The 1931 University of Manitoba Grads were inducted into the Manitoba Hockey Hall of Fame in the team category.

Player roster
George Hill 
Gordon MacKenzie
Sammy McCallum
Ward McVey
Frank Morris 
Jack Pidcock
Art Puttee
Blake Watson 
Guy "Weary" Williamson

References

External links
1931 University of Manitoba Grads at Manitoba Hockey Hall of Fame

Ice hockey teams in Winnipeg
University of Manitoba
Man